Following each National Football League (NFL) season, the Pro Football Writers Association (PFWA) compiles an honorary All-Rookie Team to recognize that season's most outstanding rookies at each position as adjudged by sportswriters of the PFWA. Teams have been selected every year since the 1974 NFL season.

1974

Offense
 Quarterback: Tom Owen, San Francisco 49ers
 Running back: Wilbur Jackson, San Francisco 49ers
 Running back: Don Woods, San Diego Chargers
 Wide receiver: Nat Moore, Miami Dolphins
 Wide receiver: Lynn Swann, Pittsburgh Steelers
 Tight end: Paul Seal, New Orleans Saints
 Center: Mike Webster, Pittsburgh Steelers
 Guard: John Hicks, New York Giants
 Guard: Tom Mullen, New York Giants
 Tackle: Charlie Getty, Kansas City Chiefs
 Tackle: Claudie Minor, Denver Broncos

Defense
 Defensive end: John Dutton, Baltimore Colts
 Defensive end: Ed "Too Tall" Jones, Dallas Cowboys
 Defensive tackle: Carl Barzilauskas, New York Jets
 Defensive tackle: Bill Kollar, Cincinnati Bengals
 Outside linebacker: Matt Blair, Minnesota Vikings
 Outside linebacker: Sam Hunt, New England Patriots
 Middle linebacker: Jack Lambert, Pittsburgh Steelers
 Cornerback: Terry Schmidt, New Orleans Saints
 Cornerback: Roscoe Word, New York Jets
 Safety: Prentice McCray, New England Patriots
 Safety: Bill Simpson, Los Angeles Rams

Special teams
 Placekicker: Efrén Herrera, Dallas Cowboys
 Punter: Dave Jennings, New York Giants

1975

Offense
 Quarterback: Steve Bartkowski, Atlanta Falcons
 Running back: Don Hardeman, Houston Oilers
 Running back: Mike Thomas, Washington Redskins
 Wide receiver: Freddie Solomon, Miami Dolphins
 Wide receiver: Rick Upchurch, Denver Broncos
 Tight end: Russ Francis, New England Patriots
 Center: Bill Reid, San Francisco 49ers
 Guard: Lynn Boden, Detroit Lions
 Guard: Burton Lawless, Dallas Cowboys
 Tackle: Doug France, Los Angeles Rams
 Tackle: Jeff Sevy, Chicago Bears

Defense
 Defensive end: Mike Hartenstine, Chicago Bears
 Defensive end: Mack Mitchell, Cleveland Browns
 Defensive tackle: Gary Johnson, San Diego Chargers
 Defensive tackle: Louie Kelcher, San Diego Chargers
 Outside linebacker: Robert Brazile, Houston Oilers
 Outside linebacker: Randy White, Dallas Cowboys
 Middle linebacker: Steve Towle, Miami Dolphins
 Cornerback: Neal Colzie, Oakland Raiders
 Cornerback: Louis Wright, Denver Broncos
 Safety: Ed Jones, Buffalo Bills
 Safety: Johnnie Gray, Green Bay Packers

Special teams
 Placekicker: Steve Mike-Mayer, San Francisco 49ers
 Punter: Neil Clabo, Minnesota Vikings

1976

Offense
 Quarterback: Jim Zorn, Seattle Seahawks
 Running back: Clark Gaines, New York Jets
 Running back: Chuck Muncie, New Orleans Saints
 Wide receiver: Steve Largent, Seattle Seahawks
 Wide receiver: Sammy White, Minnesota Vikings
 Tight end: David Hill, Detroit Lions
 Center: Randy Cross, San Francisco 49ers
 Guard: Tom Glassic, Denver Broncos
 Guard: Don Macek, San Diego Chargers
 Tackle: Mark Koncar, Green Bay Packers
 Tackle: Dennis Lick, Chicago  Bears

Defense
 Defensive end: Gary Burley, Cincinnati Bengals
 Defensive end: Charles Philyaw, Oakland Raiders
 Defensive tackle: Mike Dawson, St. Louis Cardinals
 Defensive tackle: Steve Niehaus, Seattle Seahawks
 Outside linebacker: Greg Buttle, New York Jets
 Outside linebacker: Reggie Williams, Cincinnati Bengals
 Middle linebacker: Harry Carson, New York Giants
 Cornerback: Mario Clark, Buffalo Bills
 Cornerback: Mike Haynes, New England Patriots
 Safety: Tim Fox, New England Patriots
 Safety: James Hunter, Detroit Lions

Special teams
 Placekicker: Chris Bahr, Cincinnati Bengals
 Punter: Rusty Jackson, Los Angeles Rams

1977

Offense
 Quarterback: Tommy Kramer, Minnesota Vikings
 Running back: Rob Carpenter, Houston Oilers
 Running back: Tony Dorsett, Dallas Cowboys
 Wide receiver: Billy Waddy, Los Angeles Rams
 Wide receiver: Wesley Walker, New York Jets
 Tight end: Don Hasselbeck, New England Patriots
 Center: Bob Rush, San Diego Chargers
 Guard: George Reihner, Houston Oilers
 Guard: R. C. Thielemann, Atlanta Falcons
 Tackle: Ted Albrecht, Chicago Bears
 Tackle: Warren Bryant, Atlanta Falcons

Defense
 Defensive end: Mike Butler, Green Bay Packers
 Defensive end: A. J. Duhe, Miami Dolphins
 Defensive tackle: Bob Baumhower, Miami Dolphins
 Defensive tackle: Eddie Edwards, Cincinnati Bengals
 Outside linebacker: Kim Bokamper, Miami Dolphins
 Outside linebacker: Bob Brudzinski, Los Angeles Rams
 Middle linebacker: Terry Beeson, Seattle Seahawks
 Cornerback: Raymond Clayborn, New England Patriots
 Cornerback: Gary Green, Kansas City Chiefs
 Safety: Bill Currier, Houston Oilers
 Safety: Vern Roberson, Miami Dolphins

Special teams
 Placekicker: Rafael Septién, Los Angeles Rams
 Punter: Bucky Dilts, Denver Broncos

1978

Offense
 Quarterback: Doug Williams, Tampa Bay Buccaneers
 Running back: Earl Campbell, Houston Oilers
 Running back: Terry Miller, Buffalo Bills
 Wide receiver: John Jefferson, San Diego Chargers
 Wide receiver: James Lofton, Green Bay Packers
 Tight end: Ozzie Newsome, Cleveland Browns
 Center: Blair Bush, Cincinnati Bengals
 Guard: Walt Downing, San Francisco 49ers
 Guard: Homer Elias, Detroit Lions
 Tackle: Mike Kenn, Atlanta Falcons
 Tackle: Chris Ward, New York Jets

Defense
 Defensive end: Al Baker, Detroit Lions
 Defensive end: Ross Browner, Cincinnati Bengals
 Defensive tackle: Dee Hardison, Buffalo Bills
 Defensive tackle: Don Latimer, Denver Broncos
 Outside linebacker: John Anderson, Green Bay Packers
 Outside linebacker: Reggie Wilkes, Philadelphia Eagles
 Middle linebacker: Dan Bunz, San Francisco 49ers
 Cornerback: Bobby Jackson, New York Jets
 Cornerback: Ron Johnson, Pittsburgh Steelers
 Safety: Ken Greene, St. Louis Cardinals
 Safety: John Harris, Seattle Seahawks

Special teams
 Placekicker: Frank Corral, Los Angeles Rams
 Punter: Tom Skladany, Detroit Lions

1979

Offense
 Quarterback: Phil Simms, New York Giants
 Running back: Ottis Anderson, St. Louis Cardinals
 Running back: William Andrews, Atlanta Falcons
 Wide receiver: Jerry Butler, Buffalo Bills
 Wide receiver: Earnest Gray, New York Giants
 Tight end: Dan Ross, Cincinnati Bengals
 Center: Mark Dennard, Miami Dolphins
 Guard: Cody Risien, Cleveland Browns
 Guard: Greg Roberts, Tampa Bay Buccaneers
 Tackle: Keith Dorney, Detroit Lions
 Tackle: Dave Studdard, Denver Broncos

Defense
 Defensive end: Jesse Baker, Houston Oilers
 Defensive end: Dan Hampton, Chicago Bears
 Defensive tackle: Fred Smerlas, Buffalo Bills
 Defensive tackle: Manu Tuiasosopo, Seattle Seahawks
 Outside linebacker: Jim Haslett, Buffalo Bills
 Outside linebacker: Jerry Robinson, Philadelphia Eagles
 Middle linebacker: Stan Blinka, New York Jets
 Cornerback: Larry Braziel, Baltimore Colts
 Cornerback: Henry Williams, Oakland Raiders
 Safety: Vernon Perry, Houston Oilers
 Safety: Brenard Wilson, Philadelphia Eagles

Special teams
 Placekicker: Tony Franklin, Philadelphia Eagles
 Punter: Bob Grupp, Kansas City Chiefs

1980

Offense
 Quarterback: David Woodley, Miami Dolphins
 Running back: Joe Cribbs, Buffalo Bills
 Running back: Billy Sims, Detroit Lions
 Wide receiver: Ray Butler, Baltimore Colts
 Wide receiver: Art Monk, Washington Redskins
 Tight end: Junior Miller, Atlanta Falcons
 Center: Tommie Ginn, Detroit Lions
 Guard: Tyrone McGriff, Pittsburgh Steelers
 Guard: Ray Snell, Tampa Bay Buccaneers
 Tackle: Stan Brock, New Orleans Saints
 Tackle: Anthony Muñoz, Cincinnati Bengals

Defense
 Defensive end: Jacob Green, Seattle Seahawks
 Defensive end: Rulon Jones, Denver Broncos
 Defensive tackle: Rush Brown, St. Louis Cardinals
 Defensive tackle: Jim Stuckey, San Francisco 49ers
 Outside linebacker: Bobby Leopold, San Francisco 49ers
 Outside linebacker: Al Richardson, Atlanta Falcons
 Middle linebacker: Buddy Curry, Atlanta Falcons
 Cornerback: Don McNeill, Miami Dolphins
 Cornerback: Roynell Young, Philadelphia Eagles
 Safety: Johnnie Johnson, Los Angeles Rams
 Safety: Darrol Ray, New York Jets

Special teams
 Placekicker: Eddie Murray, Detroit Lions
 Punter: Jim Miller, San Francisco 49ers

1981

Offense
 Quarterback: Neil Lomax, St. Louis Cardinals
 Running back: Joe Delaney, Kansas City Chiefs
 Running back: George Rogers, New Orleans Saints
 Wide receiver: Cris Collinsworth, Cincinnati Bengals
 Wide receiver: Ken Margerum, Chicago Bears
 Tight end: Greg LaFleur, St. Louis Cardinals
 Center: John Scully, Atlanta Falcons
 Guard: Billy Ard, New York Giants
 Guard: Curt Marsh, Oakland Raiders
 Tackle: Joe Jacoby, Washington Redskins
 Tackle: Keith Van Horne, Chicago Bears

Defense
 Defensive end: Curtis Green, Detroit Lions
 Defensive end: Donnell Thompson, Baltimore Colts
 Defensive tackle: Bill Neill, New York Giants
 Defensive tackle: Johnny Robinson, Oakland Raiders
 Outside linebacker: Hugh Green, Tampa Bay Buccaneers
 Outside linebacker: Lawrence Taylor, New York Giants
 Middle linebacker: Mike Singletary, Chicago Bears
 Cornerback: Ronnie Lott, San Francisco 49ers
 Cornerback: Everson Walls, Dallas Cowboys
 Safety: Kenny Easley, Seattle Seahawks
 Safety: Carlton Williamson, San Francisco 49ers

Special teams
 Placekicker: Mick Luckhurst, Atlanta Falcons
 Punter: Tom Orosz, Miami Dolphins

1982

Offense
 Quarterback: Jim McMahon, Chicago Bears
 Running back: Marcus Allen, Los Angeles Raiders
 Running back: Butch Woolfolk, New York Giants
 Wide receiver: Charlie Brown, Washington Redskins
 Wide receiver: Lindsay Scott, New Orleans Saints
 Tight end: Pete Metzelaars, Seattle Seahawks
 Center: Rich Umphrey, New York Giants
 Guard: Brad Edelman, New Orleans Saints
 Guard: Sean Farrell, Tampa Bay Buccaneers
 Tackle: Tootie Robbins, St. Louis Cardinals
 Tackle: Luis Sharpe, St. Louis Cardinals

Defense
 Defensive end: Bruce Clark, New Orleans Saints
 Defensive end: Kenneth Sims, New England Patriots
 Defensive tackle: Lester Williams, New England Patriots
 Defensive tackle: Leo Wisniewski, Baltimore Colts
 Outside linebacker: Chip Banks, Cleveland Browns
 Outside linebacker: Johnie Cooks, Baltimore Colts
 Middle linebacker: Tom Cousineau, Cleveland Browns
 Cornerback: Vernon Dean, Washington Redskins
 Cornerback: Bobby Watkins, Detroit Lions
 Safety: Benny Perrin, St. Louis Cardinals
 Safety: Andre Young, San Diego Chargers

Special teams
 Placekicker: Gary Anderson, Pittsburgh Steelers
 Punter: Rohn Stark, Baltimore Colts

1983

Offense
 Quarterback: Dan Marino, Miami Dolphins
 Running back: Eric Dickerson, Los Angeles Rams
 Running back: Curt Warner, Seattle Seahawks
 Wide receiver: Jeff Chadwick, Detroit Lions
 Wide receiver: Willie Gault, Chicago Bears
 Tight end: Tony Hunter, Buffalo Bills
 Center: Dave Rimington, Cincinnati Bengals
 Guard: Chris Hinton, Baltimore Colts
 Guard: Bruce Matthews, Houston Oilers
 Tackle: Jim Covert, Chicago Bears
 Tackle: Harvey Salem, Houston Oilers

Defense
 Defensive end: Mike Pitts, Atlanta Falcons
 Defensive end: Greg Townsend, Los Angeles Raiders
 Defensive tackle: Bill Pickel, Los Angeles Raiders
 Defensive tackle: Andrew Provence, Atlanta Falcons
 Outside linebacker: John Rade, Atlanta Falcons
 Outside linebacker: Vernon Maxwell, Baltimore Colts
 Middle linebacker: Mike Green, San Diego Chargers
 Cornerback: Darrell Green, Washington Redskins
 Cornerback: Danny Walters, San Diego Chargers
 Safety: Bill Bates, Dallas Cowboys
 Safety: Terry Kinard, New York Giants

Special teams
 Placekicker: Ali Haji-Sheikh, New York Giants
 Punter: Reggie Roby, Miami Dolphins

1984

Offense
 Quarterback: Warren Moon, Houston Oilers
 Running back: Alfred Anderson, Minnesota Vikings
 Running back: Greg Bell, Buffalo Bills
 Wide receiver: Louis Lipps, Pittsburgh Steelers
 Wide receiver: Daryl Turner, Seattle Seahawks
 Tight end: Clarence Kay, Denver Broncos
 Center: Jim Sweeney, New York Jets
 Guard: Brian Blados, Cincinnati Bengals
 Guard: Ron Solt, Indianapolis Colts
 Tackle: Ron Heller, Tampa Bay Buccaneers
 Tackle: Dean Steinkuhler, Houston Oilers

Defense
 Defensive end: Alphonso Carreker, Green Bay Packers
 Defensive end: Blaise Winter, Indianapolis Colts
 Defensive tackle: Bill Maas, Kansas City Chiefs
 Outside linebacker: Carl Banks, New York Giants
 Outside linebacker: Keith Browner, Tampa Bay Buccaneers
 Inside linebacker: Eugene Lockhart, Dallas Cowboys
 Inside linebacker: Gary Reasons, New York Giants
 Cornerback: Frank Minnifield, Cleveland Browns
 Cornerback: Kevin Ross, Kansas City Chiefs
 Safety: Tom Flynn, Green Bay Packers
 Safety: Don Rogers, Cleveland Browns

Special teams
 Placekicker: Paul McFadden, Philadelphia Eagles
 Punter: Brian Hansen, New Orleans Saints

1985

Offense
 Quarterback: Dieter Brock, Los Angeles Rams
 Running back: Gary Anderson, San Diego Chargers
 Running back: Kevin Mack, Cleveland Browns
 Wide receiver: Eddie Brown, Cincinnati Bengals
 Wide receiver: Jerry Rice, San Francisco 49ers
 Tight end: Mark Bavaro, New York Giants
 Center: Bart Oates, New York Giants
 Guard: Bill Fralic, Atlanta Falcons
 Guard: Tom Thayer, Chicago Bears
 Tackle: Lomas Brown, Detroit Lions
 Tackle: Jim Lachey, San Diego Chargers

Defense
 Defensive end: Ray Childress, Houston Oilers
 Defensive end: Garin Veris, New England Patriots
 Defensive tackle: Tim Newton, Minnesota Vikings
 Outside linebacker: Duane Bickett, Indianapolis Colts
 Outside linebacker: Chris Doleman, Minnesota Vikings
 Inside linebacker: Jack Del Rio, New Orleans Saints
 Inside linebacker: Brian Noble, Green Bay Packers
 Cornerback: Derrick Burroughs, Buffalo Bills
 Cornerback: John Hendy, San Diego Chargers
 Safety: Raphel Cherry, Washington Redskins
 Safety: Lonnie Young, St. Louis Cardinals

Special teams
 Placekicker: Kevin Butler, Chicago Bears
 Punter: Dale Hatcher, Los Angeles Rams

1986

Offense
 Quarterback: Jim Everett, Los Angeles Rams
 Running back: Rueben Mayes, New Orleans Saints
 Running back: John Williams, Seattle Seahawks
 Wide receiver: Bill Brooks, Indianapolis Colts
 Wide receiver: Ernest Givins, Houston Oilers
 Tight end: Greg Baty, New England Patriots
 Center: Matt Darwin, Philadelphia Eagles
 Guard: Tom Newberry, Los Angeles Rams
 Guard: Will Wolford, Buffalo Bills
 Tackle: Brian Jozwiak, Kansas City Chiefs
 Tackle: J. D. Maarleveld, Tampa Bay Buccaneers

Defense
 Defensive end: Leslie O'Neal, San Diego Chargers
 Defensive end: Brent Williams, New England Patriots
 Defensive tackle: Tony Casillas, Atlanta Falcons
 Defensive tackle: Reggie Singletary, Philadelphia Eagles
 Outside linebacker: Tim Cofield, Kansas City Chiefs
 Outside linebacker: Charles Haley, San Francisco 49ers
 Inside linebacker: Dino Hackett, Kansas City Chiefs
 Inside linebacker: John Offerdahl, Miami Dolphins
 Cornerback: Don Griffin, San Francisco 49ers
 Cornerback: Tim McKyer, San Francisco 49ers
 Safety: David Fulcher, Cincinnati Bengals
 Safety: Devon Mitchell, Detroit Lions

Special teams
 Placekicker: John Lee, St. Louis Cardinals
 Punter: John Teltschik, Philadelphia Eagles

1987

Offense
 Quarterback: Vinny Testaverde, Tampa Bay Buccaneers
 Running back: Christian Okoye, Kansas City Chiefs
 Running back: Troy Stradford, Miami Dolphins
 Wide receiver: Ricky Nattiel, Denver Broncos
 Wide receiver: Frankie Neal, Green Bay Packers
 Tight end: Rob Awalt, St. Louis Cardinals
 Center: No selection
 Guard: Todd Peat, St. Louis Cardinals
 Guard: Steve Trapilo, New Orleans Saints
 Tackle: Bruce Armstrong, New England Patriots
 Tackle: Harris Barton, San Francisco 49ers

Defense
 Defensive end: John Bosa, Miami Dolphins
 Defensive end: Shawn Knight, New Orleans Saints
 Defensive tackle: Jerry Ball, Detroit Lions
 Defensive tackle: Jerome Brown, Philadelphia Eagles
 Outside linebacker: Cornelius Bennett, Buffalo Bills
 Outside linebacker: Alex Gordon, New York Jets
 Inside linebacker: Brian Bosworth, Seattle Seahawks
 Inside linebacker: Shane Conlan, Buffalo Bills
 Cornerback: Delton Hall, Pittsburgh Steelers
 Cornerback: Nate Odomes, Buffalo Bills
 Safety: Gene Atkins, New Orleans Saints
 Safety: Thomas Everett, Pittsburgh Steelers

Special teams
 Placekicker: Jeff Jaeger, Cleveland Browns
 Punter: Ruben Rodriguez, Seattle Seahawks

1988

Offense
 Quarterback: Chris Chandler, Indianapolis Colts
 Running back: John Stephens, New England Patriots
 Running back: Ickey Woods, Cincinnati Bengals
 Wide receiver: Brian Blades, Seattle Seahawks
 Wide receiver: Tim Brown, Los Angeles Raiders
 Tight end: Keith Jackson, Philadelphia Eagles
 Center: No selection
 Guard: Randall McDaniel, Minnesota Vikings
 Guard: Eric Moore, New York Giants
 Tackle: Jumbo Elliott, New York Giants
 Tackle: Paul Gruber, Tampa Bay Buccaneers

Defense
 Defensive end: Michael Dean Perry, Cleveland Browns
 Defensive end: Danny Stubbs, San Francisco 49ers
 Defensive tackle: Tim Goad, New England Patriots
 Defensive tackle: Pierce Holt, San Francisco 49ers
 Outside linebacker: Aundray Bruce, Atlanta Falcons
 Outside linebacker: O'Brien Alston, Indianapolis Colts
 Outside linebacker: Bill Romanowski, San Francisco 49ers
 Inside linebacker: Sidney Coleman, Tampa Bay Buccaneers
 Inside linebacker: Chris Spielman, Detroit Lions
 Cornerback: Eric Allen, Philadelphia Eagles
 Cornerback: James Hasty, New York Jets
 Safety: Bennie Blades, Detroit Lions
 Safety: Erik McMillan, New York Jets

Special teams
 Placekicker: Chip Lohmiller, Washington Redskins
 Punter: Jeff Feagles, New England Patriots

1989

Offense
 Quarterback: Troy Aikman, Dallas Cowboys
 Running back: Barry Sanders, Detroit Lions
 Running back: Bobby Humphrey, Denver Broncos
 Wide receiver: Shawn Collins, Atlanta Falcons
 Wide receiver: Andre Rison, Indianapolis Colts
 Tight end: Travis McNeal, Seattle Seahawks
 Center: Courtney Hall, San Diego Chargers
 Guard: Steve Wisniewski, Los Angeles Raiders
 Guard: Joe Wolf, Phoenix Cardinals
 Tackle: Kevin Haverdink, New Orleans Saints
 Tackle: Andy Heck, Seattle Seahawks

Defense
 Defensive end: Trace Armstrong, Chicago Bears
 Defensive end: Burt Grossman, San Diego Chargers
 Defensive tackle: Bill Hawkins, Los Angeles Rams
 Defensive tackle: Tracy Rocker, Washington Redskins
 Outside linebacker: Jeff Lageman, New York Jets
 Outside linebacker: Derrick Thomas, Kansas City Chiefs
 Middle linebacker: Jerry Olsavsky, Pittsburgh Steelers
 Cornerback: Robert Massey, New Orleans Saints
 Cornerback: Deion Sanders, Atlanta Falcons
 Safety: Steve Atwater, Denver Broncos
 Safety: Carnell Lake, Detroit Lions

Special teams
 Placekicker: Chris Jacke, Green Bay Packers
 Punter: Chris Mohr, Tampa Bay Buccaneers

1990

Offense
 Quarterback: Jeff George, Indianapolis Colts
 Running back: Johnny Johnson, Phoenix Cardinals
 Running back: Emmitt Smith, Dallas Cowboys
 Wide receiver: Fred Barnett, Philadelphia Eagles
 Wide receiver: Rob Moore, New York Jets
 Wide receiver: Ricky Proehl, Phoenix Cardinals
 Tight end: Eric Green, Pittsburgh Steelers
 Center: Tim Grunhard, Kansas City Chiefs
 Guard: Keith Sims, Miami Dolphins
 Guard: Dave Szott, Kansas City Chiefs
 Tackle: Leo Goeas, San Diego Chargers
 Tackle: Richmond Webb, Miami Dolphins

Defense
 Defensive end: Ray Agnew, New England Patriots
 Defensive end: Renaldo Turnbull, New Orleans Saints 
 Defensive tackle: Jimmie Jones, Dallas Cowboys
 Defensive tackle: Cortez Kennedy, Seattle Seahawks
 Outside linebacker: James Francis, Cincinnati Bengals
 Outside linebacker: Aaron Wallace, Los Angeles Raiders
 Middle linebacker: Percy Snow, Kansas City Chiefs
 Cornerback: Ben Smith, Philadelphia Eagles
 Cornerback: James Williams, Buffalo Bills
 Safety: Robert Blackmon, Seattle Seahawks
 Safety: Mark Carrier, Chicago Bears

Special teams
 Placekicker: Steve Christie, Tampa Bay Buccaneers
 Punter: No selection

1991

Offense
 Quarterback: No selection
 Running back: Ricky Ervins, Washington Redskins
 Running back: Leonard Russell, New England Patriots
 Wide receiver: Lawrence Dawsey, Tampa Bay Buccaneers
 Wide receiver: Mike Pritchard, Atlanta Falcons
 Tight end: Adrian Cooper, Pittsburgh Steelers
 Center: John Flannery, Houston Oilers
 Guard: Ed King, Cleveland Browns
 Guard: Eric Moten, San Diego Chargers
 Tackle: Antone Davis, Philadelphia Eagles
 Tackle: Pat Harlow, New England Patriots

Defense
 Defensive end: Phil Hansen, Buffalo Bills
 Defensive end: Kenny Walker, Denver Broncos
 Defensive tackle: Moe Gardner, Atlanta Falcons
 Defensive tackle: Russell Maryland, Dallas Cowboys
 Outside linebacker: Mike Croel, Denver Broncos
 Outside kinebacker: Mo Lewis, New York Jets
 Inside linebacker: Darrick Brownlow, Dallas Cowboys
 Inside linebacker: Keith Traylor, Denver Broncos
 Cornerback: Larry Brown, Dallas Cowboys
 Cornerback: Aeneas Williams, Phoenix Cardinals
 Safety: Stanley Richard, San Diego Chargers
 Safety: Eric Turner, Cleveland Browns

Special teams
 Placekicker: John Kasay, Seattle Seahawks
 Punter: No selection

1992

Offense
 Quarterback: David Klingler, Cincinnati Bengals
 Running back: Vaughn Dunbar, New Orleans Saints
 Running back: Amp Lee, San Francisco 49ers
 Wide receiver: Carl Pickens, Cincinnati Bengals
 Wide receiver: Arthur Marshall, Denver Broncos
 Tight end: Johnny Mitchell, New York Jets
 Center: Matt Elliott, Washington Redskins
 Guard: No selection
 Guard: No selection
 Tackle: Troy Auzenne, Chicago Bears
 Tackle: Eugene Chung, New England Patriots

Defense
 Defensive end: Santana Dotson, Tampa Bay Buccaneers
 Defensive end: Chris Mims, San Diego Chargers
 Defensive tackle: Steve Emtman, Indianapolis Colts
 Defensive tackle: Sean Gilbert, Los Angeles Rams
 Outside linebacker: Quentin Coryatt, Indianapolis Colts
 Outside linebacker: Marco Coleman, Miami Dolphins
 Inside linebacker: Robert Jones, Dallas Cowboys
 Inside linebacker: Ricardo McDonald, Cincinnati Bengals
 Cornerback: Dale Carter, Kansas City Chiefs
 Cornerback: Troy Vincent, Miami Dolphins
 Safety: Dana Hall, San Francisco 49ers
 Safety: Darren Perry, Pittsburgh Steelers

Special teams
 Placekicker: Jason Hanson, Detroit Lions
 Punter: Klaus Wilmsmeyer, San Francisco 49ers
 Kickoff returner: Desmond Howard, Washington Redskins
 Punt returner: Dale Carter, Kansas City Chiefs
 Special teams: Darren Woodson, Dallas Cowboys

1993

Offense
 Quarterback: Rick Mirer, Seattle Seahawks
 Running back: Jerome Bettis, Los Angeles Rams
 Running back: Reggie Brooks, Washington Redskins
 Wide receiver: Vincent Brisby, New England Patriots
 Wide receiver: James Jett, Los Angeles Raiders
 Tight end: Tony McGee, Cincinnati Bengals
 Center: Steve Everitt, Cleveland Browns
 Guard: Lincoln Kennedy, Atlanta Falcons
 Guard: Will Shields, Kansas City Chiefs
 Tackle: Brad Hopkins, Houston Oilers
 Tackle: Willie Roaf, New Orleans Saints

Defense
 Defensive end: John Copeland, Cincinnati Bengals
 Defensive end: Eric Curry, Tampa Bay Buccaneers
 Defensive tackle: Leonard Renfro, Philadelphia Eagles
 Defensive tackle: Dana Stubblefield, San Francisco 49ers
 Outside linebacker: Darrin Smith, Dallas Cowboys
 Outside linebacker: Wayne Simmons, Green Bay Packers
 Inside linebacker: Chad Brown, Pittsburgh Steelers
 Inside linebacker: Steve Tovar, Cincinnati Bengals
 Cornerback: Tom Carter, Washington Redskins
 Cornerback: Darrien Gordon, San Diego Chargers
 Safety: Roger Harper, Atlanta Falcons
 Safety: George Teague, Green Bay Packers

Special teams
 Placekicker: Jason Elam, Denver Broncos
 Punter: John Jett, Dallas Cowboys
 Kickoff returner: Tyrone Hughes, New Orleans Saints
 Punt returner: Tyrone Hughes, New Orleans Saints
 Special teams: Jessie Armstead, New York Giants

1994

Offense
 Quarterback: Heath Shuler, Washington Redskins
 Running back: Marshall Faulk, Indianapolis Colts
 Running back: Errict Rhett, Tampa Bay Buccaneers
 Wide receiver: Derrick Alexander, Cleveland Browns
 Wide receiver: Darnay Scott, Cincinnati Bengals
 Tight end: Andrew Jordan, Minnesota Vikings
 Center: Kevin Mawae, Seattle Seahawks
 Guard: Joe Panos, Philadelphia Eagles
 Guard: Anthony Redmon, Arizona Cardinals
 Tackle: Larry Allen, Dallas Cowboys
 Tackle: Todd Steussie, Minnesota Vikings

Defense
 Defensive end: Sam Adams, Seattle Seahawks
 Defensive end: Joe Johnson, New Orleans Saints
 Defensive tackle: Tim Bowens, Miami Dolphins
 Defensive tackle: Bryant Young, San Francisco 49ers
 Linebacker: Aubrey Beavers, Miami Dolphins
 Linebacker: Rob Fredrickson, Los Angeles Raiders
 Linebacker: Willie McGinest, New England Patriots
 Linebacker: Lee Woodall, San Francisco 49ers
 Cornerback: Antonio Langham, Cleveland Browns
 Cornerback: Dewayne Washington, Minnesota Vikings
 Safety: Keith Lyle, Los Angeles Rams
 Safety: Darryl Morrison, Washington Redskins

Special teams
 Placekicker: Chris Boniol, Dallas Cowboys
 Punter: Pat O'Neill, New England Patriots
 Kickoff returner: Andre Coleman, San Diego Chargers
 Punt returner: Jeff Burris, Buffalo Bills
 Special teams: Sam Rogers, Buffalo Bills

1995

Offense
 Quarterback: Kerry Collins, Carolina Panthers
 Running back: Terrell Davis, Denver Broncos
 Running back: Curtis Martin, New England Patriots
 Wide receiver: Joey Galloway, Seattle Seahawks
 Wide receiver: Chris Sanders, Houston Oilers
 Tight end: Ken Dilger, Indianapolis Colts
 Center: Dave Wohlabaugh, New England Patriots
 Guard: Ruben Brown, Buffalo Bills
 Guard: Brenden Stai, Pittsburgh Steelers
 Tackle: Tony Boselli, Jacksonville Jaguars
 Tackle: Blake Brockermeyer, Carolina Panthers

Defense
 Defensive end: Hugh Douglas, New York Jets
 Defensive end: Mike Mamula, Philadelphia Eagles
 Defensive tackle: Warren Sapp, Tampa Bay Buccaneers
 Defensive tackle: Gary Walker, Houston Oilers
 Linebacker: Derrick Brooks, Tampa Bay Buccaneers
 Linebacker: Mark Fields, New Orleans Saints
 Linebacker: Ted Johnson, New England Patriots
 Cornerback: Tyrone Poole, Carolina Panthers
 Cornerback: Bobby Taylor, Philadelphia Eagles
 Safety: Devin Bush, Atlanta Falcons
 Safety: Orlando Thomas, Minnesota Vikings

Special teams
 Placekicker: Cole Ford, Oakland Raiders
 Punter: Tom Hutton, Philadelphia Eagles
 Kickoff returner: Tamarick Vanover, Kansas City Chiefs
 Punt returner: Tamarick Vanover, Kansas City Chiefs
 Special teams: Chad Cascadden, New York Jets

1996

Offense
 Quarterback: Tony Banks, St. Louis Rams
 Running back: Karim Abdul-Jabbar, Miami Dolphins
 Running back: Eddie George, Houston Oilers
 Wide receiver: Terry Glenn, New England Patriots
 Wide receiver: Eddie Kennison, St. Louis Rams
 Tight end: Jason Dunn, Philadelphia Eagles
 Center: Aaron Graham, Arizona Cardinals
 Guard: Jeff Hartings, Detroit Lions
 Guard: Jonathan Ogden, Baltimore Ravens
 Tackle: Willie Anderson, Cincinnati Bengals
 Tackle: John Michels, Green Bay Packers

Defense
 Defensive end: Tony Brackens, Jacksonville Jaguars
 Defensive end: Simeon Rice, Arizona Cardinals
 Defensive tackle: Daryl Gardener, Miami Dolphins
 Defensive tackle: Devin Wyman, New England Patriots
 Linebacker: Kevin Hardy, Jacksonville Jaguars
 Linebacker: John Mobley, Denver Broncos
 Linebacker: Zach Thomas, Miami Dolphins
 Cornerback: Donnie Abraham, Tampa Bay Buccaneers
 Cornerback: Walt Harris, Chicago Bears
 Safety: Brian Dawkins, Philadelphia Eagles
 Safety: Lawyer Milloy, New England Patriots

Special teams
 Placekicker: Adam Vinatieri, New England Patriots
 Punter: No selection
 Kickoff returner: Eric Moulds, Buffalo Bills
 Punt returner: Eddie Kennison, St. Louis Rams
 Special teams: Larry Izzo, Miami Dolphins

1997

Offense
 Quarterback: Jake Plummer, Arizona Cardinals
 Running back: Corey Dillon, Cincinnati Bengals
 Running back: Warrick Dunn, Tampa Bay Buccaneers
 Wide receiver: Reidel Anthony, Tampa Bay Buccaneers
 Wide receiver: Rae Carruth, Carolina Panthers
 Tight end: Tony Gonzalez, Kansas City Chiefs
 Center: Calvin Collins, Atlanta Falcons
 Guard: Tarik Glenn, Indianapolis Colts
 Guard: Frank Middleton, Tampa Bay Buccaneers
 Tackle: Walter Jones, Seattle Seahawks
 Tackle: Ross Verba, Green Bay Packers

Defense
 Defensive end: Darrell Russell, Oakland Raiders
 Defensive end: Jason Taylor, Miami Dolphins
 Defensive tackle: Antonio Anderson, Dallas Cowboys
 Defensive tackle: Renaldo Wynn, Jacksonville Jaguars
 Outside linebacker: Peter Boulware, Baltimore Ravens
 Outside linebacker: Dexter Coakley, Dallas Cowboys
 Middle linebacker: Matt Russell, Detroit Lions
 Cornerback: Shawn Springs, Seattle Seahawks
 Cornerback: Bryant Westbrook, Detroit Lions
 Safety: Sam Garnes, New York Giants
 Safety: Sammy Knight, New Orleans Saints

Special teams
 Placekicker: John Hall, New York Jets
 Punter: Ken Walter, Carolina Panthers
 Kickoff returner: Byron Hanspard, Atlanta Falcons
 Punt returner: Leon Johnson, New York Jets
 Special teams: No selection

1998

Offense
 Quarterback: Peyton Manning, Indianapolis Colts
 Running back: Rob Edwards, New England Patriots
 Running back: Fred Taylor, Jacksonville Jaguars
 Wide receiver: Randy Moss, Minnesota Vikings
 Wide receiver: Jerome Pathon, Indianapolis Colts
 Tight end: Cam Cleeland, New Orleans Saints
 Center: Kevin Long, Tennessee Oilers
 Guard: Steve McKinney, Indianapolis Colts
 Guard: Kyle Turley, New Orleans Saints
 Tackle: Jason Fabini, New York Jets
 Tackle: Ephraim Salaam, Atlanta Falcons

Defense
 Defensive end: Vonnie Holliday, Green Bay Packers
 Defensive end: Andre Wadsworth, Arizona Cardinals
 Defensive tackle: Larry Chester, Indianapolis Colts
 Defensive tackle: Brandon Whiting, Philadelphia Eagles
 Linebacker: Sam Cowart, Buffalo Bills
 Linebacker: Anthony Simmons, Seattle Seahawks
 Linebacker: Takeo Spikes, Cincinnati Bengals
 Cornerback: Terry Fair, Detroit Lions
 Cornerback: Charles Woodson, Oakland Raiders
 Safety: Donovin Darius, Jacksonville Jaguars
 Safety: Tony Parrish, Chicago Bears

Special teams
 Placekicker: Mike Vanderjagt, Indianapolis Colts
 Punter: Brad Costello, Cincinnati Bengals
 Kickoff returner: Terry Fair, Detroit Lions
 Punt returner: Jacquez Green, Tampa Bay Buccaneers
 Special teams: Tim Dwight, Atlanta Falcons

1999

Offense
 Quarterback: Tim Couch, Cleveland Browns
 Running back: Olandis Gary, Denver Broncos
 Running back: Edgerrin James, Indianapolis Colts
 Wide receiver: Torry Holt, St. Louis Rams
 Wide receiver: Kevin Johnson, Cleveland Browns
 Tight end: Jed Weaver, Philadelphia Eagles
 Center: Damien Woody, New England Patriots
 Guard: Doug Brzezinski, Philadelphia Eagles
 Guard: Randy Thomas, New York Jets
 Tackle: Jon Jansen, Washington Redskins
 Tackle: Chris Terry, Carolina Panthers

Defense
 Defensive end: Russell Davis, Chicago Bears
 Defensive end: Ebenezer Ekuban, Dallas Cowboys
 Defensive end: Jevon Kearse, Tennessee Titans
 Defensive tackle: Jason Wiltz, New York Jets
 Linebacker: Chris Claiborne, Detroit Lions
 Linebacker: Andy Katzenmoyer, New England Patriots
 Linebacker: Mike Peterson, Indianapolis Colts
 Cornerback: Champ Bailey, Washington Redskins
 Cornerback: Fernando Bryant, Jacksonville Jaguars
 Safety: Cory Hall, Cincinnati Bengals
 Safety: Jason Perry, San Diego Chargers

Special teams
 Placekicker: Martín Gramática, Tampa Bay Buccaneers
 Punter: Hunter Smith, Indianapolis Colts
 Kickoff returner: Terrence Wilkins, Indianapolis Colts
 Punt returner: Charlie Rogers, Seattle Seahawks
 Special teams: John McLaughlin, Tampa Bay Buccaneers

2000

Offense
 Quarterback: Doug Johnson, Atlanta Falcons
 Running back: Mike Anderson, Denver Broncos
 Running back: Jamal Lewis, Baltimore Ravens
 Wide receiver: Darrell Jackson, Seattle Seahawks
 Wide receiver: Sylvester Morris, Kansas City Chiefs
 Tight end: Anthony Becht, New York Jets
 Center: J. P. Darche, Seattle Seahawks
 Guard: Jeno James, Carolina Panthers
 Guard: Brad Meester, Jacksonville Jaguars
 Tackle: Chris Samuels, Washington Redskins
 Tackle: Todd Wade, Miami Dolphins

Defense
 Defensive line: Courtney Brown, Cleveland Browns
 Defensive line: Chris Hovan, Minnesota Vikings
 Defensive line: Darren Howard, New Orleans Saints
 Defensive line: Corey Simon, Philadelphia Eagles
 Linebacker: LaVar Arrington, Washington Redskins
 Linebacker: Na'il Diggs, Green Bay Packers
 Linebacker: Brian Urlacher, Chicago Bears
 Cornerback: Pat Dennis, Kansas City Chiefs
 Cornerback: Ahmed Plummer, San Francisco 49ers
 Safety: Mike Brown, Chicago Bears
 Safety: Greg Wesley, Kansas City Chiefs

Special teams
 Placekicker: Paul Edinger, Chicago Bears
 Punter: Shane Lechler, Oakland Raiders
 Kickoff returner: Darrick Vaughn, Atlanta Falcons
 Punt returner: Hank Poteat, Pittsburgh Steelers
 Special teams: J. P. Darche, Seattle Seahawks

2001

Offense
 Quarterback: Chris Weinke, Carolina Panthers
 Running back: Anthony Thomas, Chicago Bears
 Running back: LaDainian Tomlinson, San Diego Chargers
 Wide receiver: Chris Chambers, Miami Dolphins
 Wide receiver: Rod Gardner, Washington Redskins
 Tight end: Eric Johnson, San Francisco 49ers
 Center: Dominic Raiola, Detroit Lions
 Guard: Leonard Williams, Arizona Cardinals
 Guard: Steve Hutchinson, Seattle Seahawks
 Tackle: Jeff Backus, Detroit Lions
 Tackle: Kenyatta Walker, Tampa Bay Buccaneers

Defense
 Defensive end: Richard Seymour, New England Patriots
 Defensive end: Justin Smith, Cincinnati Bengals
 Defensive tackle: Shaun Rogers, Detroit Lions
 Defensive tackle: Gerard Warren, Cleveland Browns
 Linebacker: Kendrell Bell, Pittsburgh Steelers
 Linebacker: Dan Morgan, Carolina Panthers
 Linebacker: Tommy Polley, St. Louis Rams
 Cornerback: Anthony Henry, Cleveland Browns
 Cornerback: Fred Smoot, Washington Redskins
 Safety: Adam Archuleta, St. Louis Rams
 Safety: Idrees Bashir, Indianapolis Colts

Special teams
 Placekicker: Jay Feely, Atlanta Falcons
 Punter: Jason Baker, San Francisco 49ers
 Kickoff returner: Steve Smith Sr., Carolina Panthers
 Punt returner: Steve Smith Sr., Carolina Panthers
 Special teams: Jamie Winborn, San Francisco 49ers

2002

Offense
 Quarterback: David Carr, Houston Texans
 Running back: William Green, Cleveland Browns
 Running back: Clinton Portis, Denver Broncos
 Wide receiver: Antonio Bryant, Dallas Cowboys
 Wide receiver: Donté Stallworth, New Orleans Saints
 Tight end: Jeremy Shockey, New York Giants
 Center: Jason Ball, San Diego Chargers
 Guard: LeCharles Bentley, New Orleans Saints
 Guard: Kendall Simmons, Pittsburgh Steelers
 Tackle: Levi Jones, Cincinnati Bengals
 Tackle: Mike Williams, Buffalo Bills

Defense
 Defensive line: Dwight Freeney, Indianapolis Colts
 Defensive line: Carlos Hall, Tennessee Titans
 Defensive line: John Henderson, Jacksonville Jaguars
 Defensive line: Julius Peppers, Carolina Panthers
 Linebacker: Scott Fujita, Kansas City Chiefs
 Linebacker: Napoleon Harris, Oakland Raiders
 Linebacker: Ben Leber, San Diego Chargers
 Cornerback: Quentin Jammer, San Diego Chargers
 Cornerback: Derek Ross, Dallas Cowboys
 Safety: Ed Reed, Baltimore Ravens
 Safety: Roy Williams, Dallas Cowboys

Special teams
 Placekicker: Matt Bryant, New York Giants
 Punter: Dave Zastudil, Baltimore Ravens
 Kickoff returner: André Davis, Cleveland Browns
 Punt returner: Antwaan Randle El, Pittsburgh Steelers
 Special teams: Michael Lewis, Philadelphia Eagles

2003

Offense
 Quarterback: Byron Leftwich, Jacksonville Jaguars
 Running back: Domanick Davis, Houston Texans
 Running back: Onterrio Smith, Minnesota Vikings
 Wide receiver: Anquan Boldin, Arizona Cardinals
 Wide receiver: Andre Johnson, Houston Texans
 Tight end: Jason Witten, Dallas Cowboys
 Center: Dan Koppen, New England Patriots
 Guard: Vince Manuwai, Jacksonville Jaguars
 Guard: Eric Steinbach, Cincinnati Bengals
 Tackle: Jordan Gross, Carolina Panthers
 Tackle: Wade Smith, Miami Dolphins

Defense
 Defensive end: Tyler Brayton, Oakland Raiders
 Defensive end: Kevin Williams, Minnesota Vikings
 Defensive tackle: Johnathan Sullivan, New Orleans Saints
 Defensive tackle: Dewayne Robertson, New York Jets
 Outside linebacker: Terrell Suggs, Baltimore Ravens
 Outside linebacker: Pisa Tinoisamoa, St. Louis Rams
 Middle linebacker: Nick Barnett, Green Bay Packers
 Cornerback: Terence Newman, Dallas Cowboys
 Cornerback: Marcus Trufant, Seattle Seahawks
 Safety: Ken Hamlin, Seattle Seahawks
 Safety: Eugene Wilson, New England Patriots

Special teams
 Placekicker: Josh Brown, Seattle Seahawks
 Punter: Eddie Johnson, Minnesota Vikings
 Kickoff returner: Bethel Johnson, New England Patriots
 Punt returner: Zuriel Smith, Dallas Cowboys
 Special teams: David Tyree, New York Giants

2004

Offense
 Quarterback: Ben Roethlisberger, Pittsburgh Steelers
 Running back: Kevin Jones, Detroit Lions
 Running back: Julius Jones, Dallas Cowboys
 Wide receiver: Michael Clayton, Tampa Bay Buccaneers
 Wide receiver: Roy Williams, Detroit Lions
 Tight end: Chris Cooley, Washington Redskins
 Center: Alex Stepanovich, Arizona Cardinals
 Guard: Jacob Bell, Tennessee Titans
 Guard: Chris Snee, New York Giants
 Tackle: Robert Gallery, Oakland Raiders
 Tackle: Shane Olivea, San Diego Chargers

Defense
 Defensive end: Jared Allen, Kansas City Chiefs
 Defensive end: Will Smith, New Orleans Saints
 Defensive tackle: Darnell Dockett, Arizona Cardinals
 Defensive tackle: Tommie Harris, Chicago Bears
 Outside linebacker: Karlos Dansby, Arizona Cardinals
 Outside linebacker: D. J. Williams, Denver Broncos
 Middle linebacker: Jonathan Vilma, New York Jets
 Cornerback: Chris Gamble, Carolina Panthers
 Cornerback: Dunta Robinson, Houston Texans
 Safety: Michael Boulware, Seattle Seahawks
 Safety: Sean Taylor, Washington Redskins

Special teams
 Placekicker: Nate Kaeding, San Diego Chargers
 Punter: Kyle Larson, Cincinnati Bengals
 Kickoff returner: Wes Welker, Miami Dolphins
 Punt returner: B. J. Sams, Baltimore Ravens
 Special teams: Keith Lewis, San Francisco 49ers

2005

Offense
 Quarterback: Kyle Orton, Chicago Bears
 Running back: Ronnie Brown, Miami Dolphins
 Running back: Cadillac Williams, Tampa Bay Buccaneers
 Wide receiver: Mark Clayton, Baltimore Ravens
 Wide receiver: Chris Henry, Cincinnati Bengals
 Tight end: Heath Miller, Pittsburgh Steelers
 Center: Chris Spencer, Seattle Seahawks
 Guard: Dan Buenning, Tampa Bay Buccaneers
 Guard: Logan Mankins, New England Patriots
 Tackle: Jammal Brown, New Orleans Saints
 Tackle: Khalif Barnes, Jacksonville Jaguars

Defense
 Defensive line: Luis Castillo, San Diego Chargers
 Defensive line: Trent Cole, Philadelphia Eagles
 Defensive line: Mike Patterson, Philadelphia Eagles
 Defensive line: Marcus Spears, Dallas Cowboys
 Linebacker: Shawne Merriman, San Diego Chargers
 Linebacker: Lofa Tatupu, Seattle Seahawks
 Linebacker: Odell Thurman, Cincinnati Bengals
 Cornerback: Ellis Hobbs, New England Patriots
 Cornerback: Darrent Williams, Denver Broncos
 Safety: Nick Collins, Green Bay Packers
 Safety: Kerry Rhodes, New York Jets

Special teams
 Placekicker: Mike Nugent, New York Jets
 Punter: Chris Kluwe, Minnesota Vikings
 Kickoff returner: Jerome Mathis, Houston Texans
 Punt returner: Adam Jones, Tennessee Titans
 Special teams: Michael Boley, Atlanta Falcons

2006

Offense
 Quarterback: Vince Young, Tennessee Titans
 Running back: Reggie Bush, New Orleans Saints  
 Running back: Maurice Jones-Drew, Jacksonville Jaguars
 Wide receiver: Marques Colston, New Orleans Saints
 Wide receiver: Greg Jennings, Green Bay Packers 
 Tight end: Owen Daniels, Houston Texans
 Center: Nick Mangold, New York Jets
 Guard: Daryn Colledge, Green Bay Packers
 Guard: Jahri Evans, New Orleans Saints
 Tackle: D’Brickashaw Ferguson, New York Jets
 Tackle: Marcus McNeill, San Diego Chargers

Defense
 Defensive end: Mark Anderson, Chicago Bears
 Defensive end: Barry Cofield, New York Giants
 Defensive tackle: Tamba Hali, Kansas City Chiefs   
 Defensive tackle: Haloti Ngata, Baltimore Ravens
 Linebacker: A. J. Hawk, Green Bay Packers
 Linebacker: DeMeco Ryans, Houston Texans
 Middle linebacker: Ernie Sims, Detroit Lions  
 Cornerback: Tye Hill, St. Louis Rams
 Cornerback: Richard Marshall, Carolina Panthers
 Safety: Dawan Landry, Baltimore Ravens
 Safety: Donte Whitner, Buffalo Bills

Special teams
 Placekicker: Stephen Gostkowski, New England Patriots 
 Punter: Ryan Plackemeier, Seattle Seahawks
 Kickoff returner: Devin Hester, Chicago Bears  
 Punt returner: Devin Hester, Chicago Bears 
 Special teams: Bernard Pollard, Kansas City Chiefs

2007

Offense
 Quarterback: Trent Edwards, Buffalo Bills  
 Running back: Adrian Peterson, Minnesota Vikings  
 Running back: Marshawn Lynch, Buffalo Bills    
 Wide receiver: Calvin Johnson, Detroit Lions  
 Wide receiver: Dwayne Bowe, Kansas City Chiefs   
 Tight end: Greg Olsen, Chicago Bears 
 Center: Samson Satele, Miami Dolphins  
 Guard: Ben Grubbs, Baltimore Ravens  
 Guard: Arron Sears, Tampa Bay Buccaneers 
 Tackle: Joe Thomas, Cleveland Browns 
 Tackle: Tony Ugoh, Indianapolis Colts 

Defense
 Defensive end: Gaines Adams, Tampa Bay Buccaneers  
 Defensive end: Brian Robison, Minnesota Vikings  
 Defensive tackle: Ed Johnson, Indianapolis Colts   
 Defensive tackle: Amobi Okoye, Houston Texans  
 Linebacker: David Harris, New York Jets 
 Linebacker: Jon Beason, Carolina Panthers  
 Middle linebacker: Patrick Willis, San Francisco 49ers  
 Cornerback: Darrelle Revis, New York Jets
 Cornerback: Leon Hall, Cincinnati Bengals 
 Safety: LaRon Landry, Washington Redskins 
 Safety: Reggie Nelson, Jacksonville Jaguars  

Special teams
 Placekicker: Nick Folk, Dallas Cowboys 
 Punter: Daniel Sepulveda, Pittsburgh Steelers 
 Kickoff returner: Yamon Figurs, Baltimore Ravens  
 Punt returner: Ted Ginn Jr., Miami Dolphins  
 Special teams: Brandon Siler, San Diego Chargers

2008

Offense
 Quarterback: Matt Ryan, Atlanta Falcons 
 Running back: Chris Johnson, Tennessee Titans  
 Running back: Matt Forte, Chicago Bears 
 Wide receiver: DeSean Jackson, Philadelphia Eagles 
 Wide receiver: Eddie Royal, Denver Broncos 
 Tight end: John Carlson, Seattle Seahawks
 Center: Jamey Richard, Indianapolis Colts
 Guard: Carl Nicks, New Orleans Saints
 Guard: Mike Pollak, Indianapolis Colts 
 Tackle: Ryan Clady, Denver Broncos
 Tackle: Jake Long, Miami Dolphins 

Defense
 Defensive line: Sedrick Ellis, New Orleans Saints 
 Defensive line: Jason Jones, Tennessee Titans 
 Defensive line: Kendall Langford, Miami Dolphins
 Defensive line: Chris Long, St. Louis Rams
 Linebacker: Jerod Mayo, New England Patriots 
 Linebacker: Xavier Adibi, Houston Texans
 Linebacker: Curtis Lofton, Atlanta Falcons 
 Cornerback: Dominique Rodgers-Cromartie, Arizona Cardinals 
 Cornerback: Brandon Flowers, Kansas City Chiefs 
 Safety: Chris Horton, Washington Redskins 
 Safety: Kenny Phillips, New York Giants 

Special teams
 Placekicker: Dan Carpenter, Miami Dolphins 
 Punter: Brett Kern, Denver Broncos
 Kickoff returner: Leodis McKelvin, Buffalo Bills
 Punt returner: Clifton Smith, Tampa Bay Buccaneers 
 Special teams: none

2009

Offense
 Quarterback: Mark Sanchez, New York Jets
 Running back: Knowshon Moreno, Denver Broncos
 Running back: Beanie Wells, Arizona Cardinals
 Wide receiver: Austin Collie, Indianapolis Colts 
 Wide receiver: Percy Harvin, Minnesota Vikings 
 Tight end: Brandon Pettigrew, Detroit Lions
 Center: Alex Mack, Cleveland Browns
 Guard: Louis Vasquez, San Diego Chargers 
 Guard: Andy Levitre, Buffalo Bills 
 Tackle: Phil Loadholt, Minnesota Vikings 
 Tackle: Michael Oher, Baltimore Ravens

Defense
 Defensive line: Tyson Jackson, Kansas City Chiefs
 Defensive line: Terrance Knighton, Jacksonville Jaguars
 Defensive line: B. J. Raji, Green Bay Packers 
 Defensive line: Matt Shaughnessy, Oakland Raiders 
 Linebacker: Brian Cushing, Houston Texans 
 Linebacker: Clay Matthews III, Green Bay Packers 
 Linebacker: Brian Orakpo, Washington Redskins
 Cornerback: Jacob Lacey, Indianapolis Colts
 Cornerback: Vontae Davis, Miami Dolphins 
 Safety: Jarius Byrd, Buffalo Bills
 Safety: Louis Delmas, Detroit Lions

Special teams
 Placekicker: Ryan Succop, Kansas City Chiefs 
 Punter: Pat McAfee, Indianapolis Colts
 Kickoff returner: Percy Harvin, Minnesota Vikings 
 Punt returner: Quan Cosby, Cincinnati Bengals
 Special teams: LaRod Stephens-Howling, Arizona Cardinals

2010 

Offense
 Quarterback: Sam Bradford, St. Louis Rams
 Running back: LeGarrette Blount, Tampa Bay Buccaneers
 Running back: Chris Ivory, New Orleans Saints
 Wide receiver: Dez Bryant, Dallas Cowboys
 Wide receiver: Mike Williams, Tampa Bay Buccaneers
 Tight end: Rob Gronkowski, New England Patriots
 Center: Maurkice Pouncey, Pittsburgh Steelers
 Guard: Mike Iupati, San Francisco 49ers
 Guard: John Jerry, Miami Dolphins
 Tackle: Bryan Bulaga, Green Bay Packers
 Tackle: Rodger Saffold, St. Louis Rams

Defense
 Defensive line: Tyson Alualu, Jacksonville Jaguars
 Defensive line: Carlos Dunlap, Cincinnati Bengals
 Defensive line: Lamarr Houston, Oakland Raiders
 Defensive line: Ndamukong Suh, Detroit Lions
 Linebacker: Pat Angerer, Indianapolis Colts
 Linebacker: Rolando McClain, Oakland Raiders
 Linebacker: Koa Misi, Miami Dolphins
 Cornerback: Joe Haden, Cleveland Browns
 Cornerback: Devin McCourty, New England Patriots
 Safety: Eric Berry, Kansas City Chiefs
 Safety: T. J. Ward, Cleveland Browns

Special teams
 Placekicker: Clint Stitser, Cincinnati Bengals
 Punter: Zoltan Mesko, New England Patriots
 Kickoff returner: Jacoby Ford, Oakland Raiders
 Punt returner: Marc Mariani, Tennessee Titans
 Special teams: T. J. Ward, Cleveland Browns

2011 

Offense
 Quarterback: Cam Newton, Carolina Panthers
 Running back: Roy Helu, Washington Redskins
 Running back: DeMarco Murray, Dallas Cowboys
 Wide receiver: A. J. Green, Cincinnati Bengals
 Wide receiver: Julio Jones, Atlanta Falcons
 Tight end: Kyle Rudolph, Minnesota Vikings
 Center: Mike Pouncey, Miami Dolphins
 Guard: Danny Watkins, Philadelphia Eagles
 Guard: Stefen Wisniewski, Oakland Raiders
 Tackle: Tyron Smith, Dallas Cowboys
 Tackle: Nate Solder, New England Patriots

Defense
 Defensive line: Jabaal Sheard, Cleveland Browns
 Defensive line: J. J. Watt, Houston Texans
 Defensive line: Marcell Dareus, Buffalo Bills
 Defensive line: Phil Taylor, Cleveland Browns
 Linebacker: Ryan Kerrigan, Washington Redskins
 Linebacker: Von Miller, Denver Broncos
 Linebacker: Aldon Smith, San Francisco 49ers
 Cornerback: Patrick Peterson, Arizona Cardinals
 Cornerback: Richard Sherman, Seattle Seahawks
 Safety: Chris Conte, Chicago Bears
 Safety: Chris Harris Jr., Denver Broncos

Special teams
 Placekicker: Dan Bailey, Dallas Cowboys
 Punter: Matt Bosher, Atlanta Falcons
 Kickoff returner: Randall Cobb, Green Bay Packers
 Punt returner: Patrick Peterson, Arizona Cardinals
 Special teams: Akeem Dent, Atlanta Falcons

2012

Offense
 Quarterback: Robert Griffin III, Washington Redskins
 Running back: Alfred Morris, Washington Redskins
 Running back: Doug Martin, Tampa Bay Buccaneers
 Wide receiver: Justin Blackmon, Jacksonville Jaguars
 Wide receiver: T. Y. Hilton, Indianapolis Colts
 Tight end: Dwayne Allen, Indianapolis Colts
 Center: none
 Guard: Amini Silatolu, Carolina Panthers
 Guard: Kevin Zeitler, Cincinnati Bengals
 Tackle: Matt Kalil, Minnesota Vikings
 Tackle: Mitchell Schwartz, Cleveland Browns

Defense
 Defensive line: Michael Brockers, St. Louis Rams
 Defensive line: Fletcher Cox, Philadelphia Eagles
 Defensive line: Chandler Jones, New England Patriots
 Defensive line: Bruce Irvin, Seattle Seahawks
 Linebacker: Lavonte David, Tampa Bay Buccaneers
 Linebacker: Luke Kuechly, Carolina Panthers
 Linebacker: Bobby Wagner, Seattle Seahawks
 Cornerback: Casey Hayward, Green Bay Packers
 Cornerback: Janoris Jenkins, St. Louis Rams
 Safety: Mark Barron, Tampa Bay Buccaneers
 Safety: Harrison Smith, Minnesota Vikings

Special teams
 Placekicker: Blair Walsh, Minnesota Vikings
 Punter: Bryan Anger, Jacksonville Jaguars
 Kickoff returner: David Wilson, New York Giants
 Punt returner: T. Y. Hilton, Indianapolis Colts
 Special teams: Johnson Bademosi, Cleveland Browns

2013

Offense
 Quarterback: Mike Glennon, Tampa Bay Buccaneers
 Running back: Giovani Bernard, Cincinnati Bengals
 Running back: Eddie Lacy, Green Bay Packers
 Wide receiver: Keenan Allen, San Diego Chargers
 Wide receiver: DeAndre Hopkins, Houston Texans
 Tight end: Jordan Reed, Washington Redskins
 Center: Travis Frederick, Dallas Cowboys
 Guard: Kyle Long, Chicago Bears
 Guard: Larry Warford, Detroit Lions
 Tackle: D. J. Fluker, San Diego Chargers
 Tackle: Justin Pugh, New York Giants

Defense
 Defensive line: Ezekiel Ansah, Detroit Lions
 Defensive line: Star Lotulelei, Carolina Panthers
 Defensive line: Sheldon Richardson, New York Jets
 Defensive line: Kawann Short, Carolina Panthers
 Linebacker: Kiko Alonso, Buffalo Bills
 Linebacker: Sio Moore, Oakland Raiders
 Linebacker: Alec Ogletree, St. Louis Rams
 Cornerback: Tyrann Mathieu, Arizona Cardinals
 Cornerback: Desmond Trufant, Atlanta Falcons
 Safety: Eric Reid, San Francisco 49ers
 Safety: Kenny Vaccaro, New Orleans Saints

Special teams
 Placekicker: Caleb Sturgis, Miami Dolphins
 Punter: Sam Martin, Detroit Lions
 Kickoff returner: Cordarrelle Patterson, Minnesota Vikings
 Punt returner: Tavon Austin, St. Louis Rams
 Special teams: Don Jones, Miami Dolphins

2014

Offense
 Quarterback: Teddy Bridgewater, Minnesota Vikings
 Running back: Jeremy Hill, Cincinnati Bengals
 Running back: Tre Mason, St. Louis Rams
 Wide receiver: Odell Beckham Jr., New York Giants
 Wide receiver: Mike Evans, Tampa Bay Buccaneers
 Tight end: Jace Amaro, New York Jets
 Center: Corey Linsley, Green Bay Packers
 Guard: Joel Bitonio, Cleveland Browns
 Guard: Zack Martin, Dallas Cowboys
 Tackle: Taylor Lewan, Tennessee Titans
 Tackle: Ja'Wuan James, Miami Dolphins

Defense
 Defensive line: Aaron Donald, St. Louis Rams
 Defensive line: Timmy Jernigan, Baltimore Ravens
 Defensive line: Kony Ealy, Carolina Panthers
 Defensive line: Justin Ellis, Oakland Raiders
 Linebacker: Chris Borland, San Francisco 49ers
 Linebacker: Khalil Mack, Oakland Raiders
 Linebacker: C. J. Mosley, Baltimore Ravens
 Cornerback: Kyle Fuller, Chicago Bears
 Cornerback: E. J. Gaines, St. Louis Rams
 Safety: Deone Bucannon, Arizona Cardinals
 Safety: Ha Ha Clinton-Dix, Green Bay Packers

Special teams
 Placekicker: Cody Parkey, Philadelphia Eagles
 Punter: Pat O'Donnell, Chicago Bears
 Kickoff returner: Jarvis Landry, Miami Dolphins
 Punt returner: De'Anthony Thomas, Kansas City Chiefs
 Special teams: Trey Burton, Philadelphia Eagles

2015

Offense
 Quarterback: Jameis Winston, Tampa Bay Buccaneers
 Running back: Todd Gurley, St. Louis Rams
 Running back: Thomas Rawls, Seattle Seahawks
 Wide receiver: Amari Cooper, Oakland Raiders
 Wide receiver: Stefon Diggs, Minnesota Vikings
 Tight end: Will Tye, New York Giants
 Center: Mitch Morse, Kansas City Chiefs
 Guard: Ali Marpet, Tampa Bay Buccaneers
 Guard: Brandon Scherff, Washington Redskins
 Tackle: Rob Havenstein, St. Louis Rams
 Tackle: Donovan Smith, Tampa Bay Buccaneers

Defense
 Defensive line: Malcom Brown, New England Patriots
 Defensive line: Eddie Goldman, Chicago Bears
 Defensive line: Danielle Hunter, Minnesota Vikings
 Defensive line: Leonard Williams, New York Jets
 Linebacker: Kwon Alexander, Tampa Bay Buccaneers
 Linebacker: Stephone Anthony, New Orleans Saints
 Linebacker: Eric Kendricks, Minnesota Vikings
 Cornerback: Ronald Darby, Buffalo Bills
 Cornerback: Marcus Peters, Kansas City Chiefs
 Safety: Adrian Amos, Chicago Bears
 Safety: Landon Collins, New York Giants

Special teams
 Placekicker: Josh Lambo, San Diego Chargers
 Punter: Matt Darr, Miami Dolphins
 Kickoff returner: Tyler Lockett, Seattle Seahawks
 Punt returner: Tyler Lockett, Seattle Seahawks
 Special teams: Tyler Lockett, Seattle Seahawks

2016

Offense
 Quarterback: Dak Prescott, Dallas Cowboys
 Running back: Ezekiel Elliott, Dallas Cowboys
 Running back: Jordan Howard, Chicago Bears
 Wide receiver: Sterling Shepard, New York Giants
 Wide receiver: Michael Thomas, New Orleans Saints
 Tight end: Hunter Henry, San Diego Chargers
 Center: Cody Whitehair, Chicago Bears
 Guard: Joe Thuney, New England Patriots
 Guard: Laremy Tunsil, Miami Dolphins
 Tackle: Jack Conklin, Tennessee Titans
 Tackle: Taylor Decker, Detroit Lions

Defense
 Defensive line: Joey Bosa, San Diego Chargers
 Defensive line: DeForest Buckner, San Francisco 49ers
 Defensive line: Chris Jones, Kansas City Chiefs
 Defensive line: Yannick Ngakoue, Jacksonville Jaguars
 Linebacker: Jatavis Brown, San Diego Chargers 
 Linebacker: Leonard Floyd, Chicago Bears
 Linebacker: Deion Jones, Atlanta Falcons
 Cornerback: Vernon Hargreaves, Tampa Bay Buccaneers
 Cornerback: Jalen Ramsey, Jacksonville Jaguars
 Safety: Karl Joseph, Oakland Raiders
 Safety: Keanu Neal, Atlanta Falcons

Special teams
 Placekicker: Wil Lutz, New Orleans Saints
 Punter: Riley Dixon, Denver Broncos
 Kickoff returner: Tyreek Hill, Kansas City Chiefs
 Punt returner: Tyreek Hill, Kansas City Chiefs
 Special teams: Tyreek Hill, Kansas City Chiefs

2017

Offense
 Quarterback: Deshaun Watson, Houston Texans
 Running back: Kareem Hunt, Kansas City Chiefs
 Running back: Alvin Kamara, New Orleans Saints
 Wide receiver: Cooper Kupp, Los Angeles Rams
 Wide receiver: JuJu Smith-Schuster, Pittsburgh Steelers
 Tight end: Evan Engram, New York Giants
 Center: Pat Elflein, Minnesota Vikings
 Guard: Dan Feeney, Los Angeles Chargers
 Guard: Jermaine Eluemunor, Baltimore Ravens
 Guard: Ethan Pocic, Seattle Seahawks
 Tackle: Garett Bolles, Denver Broncos
 Tackle: Ryan Ramczyk, New Orleans Saints 

Defense
 Defensive line: Derek Barnett, Philadelphia Eagles
 Defensive line: Myles Garrett, Cleveland Browns
 Defensive line: Carl Lawson, Cincinnati Bengals
 Defensive line: Dalvin Tomlinson, New York Giants
 Linebacker: Jarrad Davis, Detroit Lions
 Linebacker: Reuben Foster, San Francisco 49ers
 Linebacker: T. J. Watt, Pittsburgh Steelers
 Cornerback: Marshon Lattimore, New Orleans Saints
 Cornerback: Tre'Davious White, Buffalo Bills
 Safety: Jamal Adams, New York Jets
 Safety: Marcus Williams, New Orleans Saints

Special teams
 Placekicker: Harrison Butker, Kansas City Chiefs
 Punter: Rigoberto Sanchez, Indianapolis Colts
 Kickoff returner: Ryan Switzer, Dallas Cowboys
 Punt returner: Jamal Agnew, Detroit Lions
 Special teams: Budda Baker, Arizona Cardinals

2018

Offense
 Quarterback: Baker Mayfield. Cleveland Browns
 Running back: Saquon Barkley, New York Giants
 Running back: Phillip Lindsay, Denver Broncos
 Wide receiver: Calvin Ridley, Atlanta Falcons
 Wide receiver: D. J. Moore, Carolina Panthers
 Tight end: Chris Herndon, New York Jets
 Center: Billy Price, Cincinnati Bengals
 Guard: Will Hernandez, New York Giants
 Guard: Quenton Nelson, Indianapolis Colts
 Tackle: Mike McGlinchey, San Francisco 49ers
 Tackle: Braden Smith, Indianapolis Colts

Defense
 Defensive line: Bradley Chubb, Denver Broncos
 Defensive line: Marcus Davenport, New Orleans Saints
 Defensive line: Da'Shawn Hand, Detroit Lions
 Defensive line: Daron Payne, Washington Redskins
 Linebacker: Shaquille Leonard, Indianapolis Colts
 Linebacker: Roquan Smith, Chicago Bears
 Linebacker: Leighton Vander Esch, Dallas Cowboys
 Cornerback: Jaire Alexander, Green Bay Packers
 Cornerback: Denzel Ward, Cleveland Browns
 Safety: Jessie Bates, Cincinnati Bengals
 Safety: Derwin James, Los Angeles Chargers

Special teams
 Placekicker: Jason Sanders, Miami Dolphins
 Punter: Michael Dickson, Seattle Seahawks
 Kickoff returner: Tremon Smith, Kansas City Chiefs
 Punt returner: Christian Kirk, Arizona Cardinals
 Special teams: Ezekiel Turner, Arizona Cardinals

2019

Offense
 Quarterback: Kyler Murray, Arizona Cardinals
 Running back: Josh Jacobs, Oakland Raiders
 Running back: Miles Sanders, Philadelphia Eagles
 Wide receiver: A. J. Brown, Tennessee Titans
 Wide receiver: Terry McLaurin, Washington Redskins
 Tight end: Noah Fant, Denver Broncos
 Center: Erik McCoy, New Orleans Saints
 Guard: Elgton Jenkins, Green Bay Packers
 Guard: Dalton Risner, Denver Broncos
 Tackle: Tytus Howard, Houston Texans
 Tackle: Jawaan Taylor, Jacksonville Jaguars

Defense
 Defensive line: Josh Allen, Jacksonville Jaguars
 Defensive line: Nick Bosa, San Francisco 49ers
 Defensive line: Dexter Lawrence, New York Giants
 Defensive line: Ed Oliver, Buffalo Bills
 Linebacker: Devin Bush Jr., Pittsburgh Steelers
 Linebacker: Devin White, Tampa Bay Buccaneers
 Linebacker: Dre Greenlaw, San Francisco 49ers
 Cornerback: Chauncey Gardner-Johnson, New Orleans Saints
 Cornerback: Sean Murphy-Bunting, Tampa Bay Buccaneers
 Safety: Darnell Savage, Green Bay Packers
 Safety: Juan Thornhill, Kansas City Chiefs

Special teams
 Placekicker: Austin Seibert, Cleveland Browns
 Punter: Jamie Gillan, Cleveland Browns
 Kickoff returner: Mecole Hardman, Kansas City Chiefs
 Punt returner: Deonte Harris, New Orleans Saints
 Special teams: Drue Tranquill, Los Angeles Chargers

2020

Offense
 Quarterback: Justin Herbert, Los Angeles Chargers
 Running back: James Robinson, Jacksonville Jaguars
 Running back: Jonathan Taylor, Indianapolis Colts
 Wide receiver: Chase Claypool, Pittsburgh Steelers
 Wide receiver: Justin Jefferson, Minnesota Vikings
 Tight end: Harrison Bryant, Cleveland Browns
 Center: Lloyd Cushenberry, Denver Broncos
 Guard: Damien Lewis, Seattle Seahawks
 Guard: Michael Onwenu, New England Patriots
 Tackle: Jedrick Wills, Cleveland Browns
 Tackle: Tristan Wirfs, Tampa Bay Buccaneers

Defense
 Defensive line: Derrick Brown, Carolina Panthers
 Defensive line: Raekwon Davis, Miami Dolphins
 Defensive line: Javon Kinlaw, San Francisco 49ers
 Defensive line: Chase Young, Washington Football Team
 Linebacker: Kenneth Murray, Los Angeles Chargers
 Linebacker: Patrick Queen, Baltimore Ravens
 Linebacker: Isaiah Simmons, Arizona Cardinals
 Cornerback: Cameron Dantzler, Minnesota Vikings
 Cornerback: L'Jarius Sneed, Kansas City Chiefs
 Safety: Jeremy Chinn, Carolina Panthers
 Safety: Antoine Winfield Jr., Tampa Bay Buccaneers

Special teams
 Placekicker: Rodrigo Blankenship, Indianapolis Colts
 Punter: Tommy Townsend, Kansas City Chiefs
 Kickoff returner: Isaiah Rodgers, Indianapolis Colts
 Punt returner: James Proche, Baltimore Ravens
 Special teams: Jordan Glasgow, Indianapolis Colts

2021

Offense
 Quarterback: Mac Jones, New England Patriots
 Running back: Najee Harris, Pittsburgh Steelers
 Running back: Javonte Williams, Denver Broncos
 Wide receiver: Ja'Marr Chase, Cincinnati Bengals
 Wide receiver: Jaylen Waddle, Miami Dolphins
 Tight end: Kyle Pitts, Atlanta Falcons
 Center: Creed Humphrey, Kansas City Chiefs
 Guard: Trey Smith, Kansas City Chiefs
 Guard: Alijah Vera-Tucker, New York Jets
 Tackle: Rashawn Slater, Los Angeles Chargers
 Tackle: Penei Sewell, Detroit Lions

Defense
 Defensive line: Christian Barmore, New England Patriots
 Defensive line: Odafe Oweh, Baltimore Ravens
 Defensive line: Kwity Paye, Indianapolis Colts
 Defensive line: Jaelan Phillips, Miami Dolphins
 Linebacker: Nick Bolton, Kansas City Chiefs
 Linebacker: Jeremiah Owusu-Koramoah, Cleveland Browns
 Linebacker: Micah Parsons, Dallas Cowboys
 Cornerback: Greg Newsome II, Cleveland Browns
 Cornerback: Patrick Surtain II, Denver Broncos
 Safety: Jevon Holland, Miami Dolphins
 Safety: Trevon Moehrig, Las Vegas Raiders

Special teams
 Placekicker: Evan McPherson, Cincinnati Bengals
 Punter: Pressley Harvin III, Pittsburgh Steelers
 Kickoff returner: Kene Nwangwu, Minnesota Vikings
 Punt returner: Demetric Felton, Cleveland Browns
 Special teams: Nick Niemann, Los Angeles Chargers

2022

Offense
 Quarterback: Brock Purdy, San Francisco 49ers
 Running back: Tyler Allgeier, Atlanta Falcons
 Running back: Kenneth Walker III, Seattle Seahawks
 Wide receiver: Chris Olave, New Orleans Saints
 Wide receiver: Garrett Wilson, New York Jets
 Tight end: Chigoziem Okonkwo, Tennessee Titans
 Center: Tyler Linderbaum, Baltimore Ravens
 Guard: Zion Johnson, Los Angeles Chargers
 Guard: Dylan Parham, Las Vegas Raiders
 Tackle: Braxton Jones, Chicago Bears
 Tackle: Tyler Smith, Dallas Cowboys

Defense
 Defensive line: Jordan Davis, Philadelphia Eagles
 Defensive line: Aidan Hutchinson, Detroit Lions
 Defensive line: George Karlaftis, Kansas City Chiefs
 Defensive line: Kayvon Thibodeaux, New York Giants
 Linebacker: Devin Lloyd, Jacksonville Jaguars
 Linebacker: Malcolm Rodriguez, Detroit Lions
 Linebacker: Quay Walker, Green Bay Packers
 Cornerback: Sauce Gardner, New York Jets
 Cornerback: Tariq Woolen, Seattle Seahawks
 Safety: Kyle Hamilton, Baltimore Ravens
 Safety: Jalen Pitre, Houston Texans

Special teams
 Placekicker: Cameron Dicker, Los Angeles Chargers
 Punter: Ryan Stonehouse, Tennessee Titans
 Kickoff returner: Dallis Flowers, Indianapolis Colts
 Punt returner: Marcus Jones, New England Patriots
 Special teams: Brenden Schooler, New England Patriots

See also
 All-Pro
 National Football League Rookie of the Year Award

References

External links
 1974–1979 All-Rookie Teams
 1980–1989 All-Rookie Teams
 1990–1999 All-Rookie Teams
 2000–2009 All-Rookie Teams
 2010–2019 All-Rookie Teams

National Football League trophies and awards
Rookie player awards